WJWC may refer to:

 WJWC-LP, a low-power radio station (97.3 FM) licensed to serve Grand Rapids, Michigan, United States
 WJWC-LP (defunct), a defunct low-power radio station (101.9 FM) formerly licensed to serve Gallion, Alabama, United States
 World Junior Wushu Championships, an international wushu competition for competitors below 18 years of age
 Women Journalists Without Chains, a group created by Tawakkol Karman, who was awarded the 2011 Nobel Peace Prize